Australia  hosted the 1962 British Empire and Commonwealth Games in Perth, Western Australia, from 22 November to 1 December 1962. It was Australia's seventh appearance at the Commonwealth Games, having competed at every Games since their inception in 1930.

Australia won medals in nine of the ten sports that it entered.

Medallists
The following Australian competitors won medals at the games.

|  style="text-align:left; width:78%; vertical-align:top;"|

| width="22%" align="left" valign="top" |

|}

Athletics

Australian athletics selectors announced on 21 October 1962 a team of 78 athletes consisting of 54 men and 24 women.

Men
Track & road events

Field events

Women
Track events

Field events

Officials
Commandant & General Manager: Edgar Tanner 
Assistant General Manager: Arthur Tunstall 
Team Secretary: Owen Davies
Attache: Kent Hughes 
Section Officials: Athletics Manager - Alfred Robinson, Athletics Manageress - Maisie McQuiston, Track Coach - Stewart Embling, Field Coach - Desmond Frawley ; Lawn Bowls Manager - Charles Smart ; Boxing Manager - George Dickinson, Boxing Trainer/Coach - Ronald Barkli ; Cycling Manager - Ronald O'Donnell, Track Coach - William Guyatt, Road Coach - Joseph Buckley ; Fencing Manager - Laurence Smith, Fencing Coach - Charles Stanmore ; Rowing Manager - Noel Wilkinson ; Rowing Coach Singles and Double Sculls - Kevyn Webb, Rowing Coach Coxed Fours - Albert Bell, Rowing Coach Coxed Pairs and Fours - Wilhelmus Sirks, Rowing Coach Eights - Alan Jacobsen ; Swimming Manager - Stuart Alldridt, Swimming Manageress - Dorothy Nordahl, Men's Swimming Coach - Don Talbot, Women's Swimming Coach - Arthur Cusack ; Diving Coach - Jack Barnett ; Weightlifting Manager - Bryan Marsden, Diving Coach/Trainer - Clive Morrison ; Wrestling Manager - Richard Rodda, Coach /Trainer - Reginald Dowton

See also
 Australia at the 1960 Summer Olympics
 Australia at the 1964 Summer Olympics

References

External links 
Commonwealth Games Australia Results Database

1962
Nations at the 1962 British Empire and Commonwealth Games
British Empire and Commonwealth Games